Huwag Kang Lalabas is a 2021 Philippine horror anthology film directed by Adolfo Alix Jr. under Obra Cinema and Cineko Productions.

Synopsis

Kumbento
"Kumbento" revolves around nuns in a convent.

Bahay
Uncircumcised boys are killed by a monster at night by the river under mysterious circumstances. A mother (Aiko Melendez) is anxious about getting her teenaged son (Joaquin Domagoso) circumcised through a traditional ritual conducted in a riverbank which could save him from death.

Hotel
A returning Overseas Filipino Worker (Kim Chiu) from Japan returns to the Philippines amidst the COVID-19 pandemic, bringing home with her a memento. She had to stay in a hotel in Baguio due to mandatory quarantine protocols. There, she met an old man who warns her about the facility she and other returning migrant workers are staying. Few days into the quarantine, some of them tested positive for COVID-19 and had to undergo isolation.

Cast

Kumbento
Beauty Gonzalez as Teresa
Elizabeth Oropesa as Fides
Yasser Marta as Lucas
Matet de Leon as Rosa
Tanya Gomez as Feliza
Marcus Madrigal as Arnulfo

Bahay
Aiko Melendez as Espie
Joaquin Domagoso as Buboy
James Blanco as Berting
Bembol Roco as Mandurugo
Dave Bornea as Nano
Ayeesha Cervantes as Pipay
Soliman Cruz as Tasyo

Hotel
Kim Chiu as Amor
Jameson Blake as Jeric
Tina Paner as Patring
Brenda Mage as Bini
Donna Carriaga as Daday
Rico Barrera as Hotel Personnel
Allan Paule as Buboy

Production
Huwag Kang Lalabas was produced under Obra Cinema and Cineko Productions with Adolfo Alix Jr. as its director. It is an anthology film with three parts based on folklore and urban legends namely "Kumbento", "Bahay", and "Hotel". Principal photography for "Kumbento" and "Hotel" took place in Baguio while "Bahay" was filmed in San Jose del Monte, Bulacan in the middle of the COVID-19 pandemic. Filming wrapped up in Baguio on July 1, 2021. The title of the film according to Alix came from star actress Kim Chiu quote "Huwag kang lalabas" in reference to the COVID-19 lockdowns in 2020.

Release
Huwag Kang Lalabas will be released in the Philippines on December 25, 2021, as one of the official entries of the 2021 Metro Manila Film Festival.

References

Philippine horror anthology films
Films shot in Baguio
Films shot in Bulacan
Films about the COVID-19 pandemic
Films about Catholic nuns
2021 horror films
Films directed by Adolfo Alix Jr.